Spitsy is a rural locality (a village) in Domshinskoye Rural Settlement, Sheksninsky District, Vologda Oblast, Russia. The population was 28 as of 2002.

Geography 
Spitsy is located 44 km southeast of Sheksna (the district's administrative centre) by road. Katayevo is the nearest rural locality.

References 

Rural localities in Sheksninsky District